"Snurra min jord" is a song recorded by Finnish singer Krista Siegfrids. The song was released as a digital download in Finland on 26 February 2017. The song peaked at number 27 on the Finnish Download Chart. The song was written by Krista Siegfrids, Gustaf Svenungsson, Magnus Wallin and Gabriel Alares. It took part in Melodifestivalen 2017, and placed seventh in the third semi-final on 18 February 2017.

Track listing

Chart performance

Release history

References

2017 singles
2017 songs
Krista Siegfrids songs
Songs written by Gabriel Alares
Songs written by Krista Siegfrids